Champua is a notified area council in Kendujhar district in the state of Odisha, India.As per SC &  ST department of Odisha, the Champua sub-division is under scheduled areas of Odisha. Nicholson Forest training institute is present here. The suburb has its importance as it provides a major trade route for transport of iron ore and manganese from some of the major mines of the state to the nearest port & out-state depots. It is also known for its pre-independence truss bridge built by British rulers, the judicial buildings of the same period as well as a few educational institutes who have a good reputation in the state. The river Baitarani flows by Champua, which is one of the largest rivers of the state second only to Mahanadi.

Major Tribes
Champua block is inhabited by tribal communities like Ho, Juang, Bhuinya, Oraon, Gond, Bhumij and other tribal communities . These tribes constitute nearly 87.21% population of the Sub-division.

Geography
It has an average elevation of 346 metres (1135 feet).

Demographics
Champua has a population of 10,394, of which 5,543 are males, while 4,851 are females as per a report released by Census India 2011. The literacy rate of Champua city is 87.00% higher than the state average of 72.87%. Male literacy is 90.85%, while female literacy rate is 82.59%.

Languages
As the champua area has been dominated by Ho people, local people widely speak in the Ho language [it is written with the "Varang Kshiti" (also "Warang Chiti" script)] as their mode of communication. Most people can speak, write all three languages Odia, Hindi, and English.

Politics
The current MLA for Champua (GE) Assembly Constituency is Minaskhi Mahanta, of the Biju Janata Dal (BJD) party, who defeated Murali Sharma, a candidate from the Bharatiya Janata Party (BJP).

Champua is part of Keonjhar (Lok Sabha constituency).

References

Cities and towns in Kendujhar district